Indians in Portugal, including recent immigrants and people who trace their ancestry back to India, together number around 81,393.  They are concentrated in Lisbon and Porto. Indians are also found in the Algarve, Coimbra, Guarda, Leiria, Odemira and Rio Maior. They consist of Goans, Gujaratis, Tamilians, and Malayali people from Daman and Diu, Tamil Nadu and most recently Punjabis.
The 2010s, particularly the second half of the decade, saw the start of a new immigration wave of Indians to Portugal - as well as of citizens of other South Asian nationals, namely Nepalis, Bengalis and Pakistanis -, propelled mainly by the need of unskilled agricultural workers and other types of unskilled workers.

History

In sixteenth century southern Portugal, there were Chinese slaves but the number of them was described as "negligible", being outnumbered by East Indian, Mourisco, and African slaves. Amerindians, Chinese, Malays, and Indians were slaves in Portugal but in far fewer number than Turks, Berbers and Arabs. China and Malacca were origins of slaves delivered to Portugal by Portuguese viceroys.

A Portuguese woman, Dona Ana de Ataíde owned an Indian man named António as a slave in Évora. He served as a cook for her. Ana de Ataíde's Indian slave escaped from her in 1587. A large number of slaves were forcibly brought there since the commercial, artisanal, and service sectors all flourished in a regional capital like Évora. Rigorous and demanding tasks were assigned to Mourisco, Chinese, and Indian slaves. Chinese, Mouriscos, and Indians were among the ethnicities of prized slaves and were much more expensive compared to blacks, so high class individuals owned these ethnicities.

A fugitive Indian slave from Evora named António went to Badajoz after leaving his master in 1545. António was among the three most common male names given to male slaves in Evora.

Antão Azedo took an Indian slave named Heitor to Evora, who along with another slave was from Bengal were among the 34 Indian slaves in total who were owned by Tristão Homem, a nobleman in 1544 in Evora. Manuel Gomes previously owned a slave who escaped in 1558 at age 18 and he was said to be from the "land of Prester John of the Indias" named Diogo.

In Evora, men were owned and used as slaves by female establishments like convents for nuns. A capelão do rei, father João Pinto left an Indian man in Porto where he was picked up in 1546 by the Evora-based Santa Marta convent's nuns to serve as their slave. However, female slaves did not serve in male establishments, unlike vice versa.

Japanese Christian Daimyos mainly responsible for selling to the Portuguese their fellow Japanese. Japanese women and Japanese men, Javanese, Chinese, and Indians were all sold as slaves in Portugal.

Traits such as high intelligence were ascribed to Indians, Chinese, and Japanese slaves.

Notable people with Indian ancestry
Antonio Costa - Prime Minister of Portugal
Narana Coissoró- Portuguese Speaker of the House
João Leão- Former Finance Minister of Portugal
Alfredo Nobre da Costa- Former Prime Minister of Portugal

See also
Hinduism in Portugal
India–Portugal relations
Romani people in Portugal

References

External links
 https://web.archive.org/web/20070218220705/http://www.indembassy-lisbon.org/uk/ind_personorigin.html

Ethnic groups in Portugal
Portugal
Portugal
Immigration to Portugal